This is a list of episodes of the 2008 Japanese animated television series . The episodes are directed by Masayoshi Nishida, and produced by Madhouse in collaboration with Tezuka Productions, along with Geneon which is in charge of music. The episodes are based on the light novel series Allison, and its sequel Lillia and Treize, which is where the title for the anime series is derived from. The episodes aired in Japan on NHK between April 3 and October 2, 2008. The episodes adapted the source material over twenty-six episodes, with the first half encompassing the Allison novels, and the second half covering the Lillia and Treize novels.

Two pieces of theme music are used for the episodes; one opening theme and one ending theme.

Episode list

References

External links
Official website 

Allison and Lillia